The 1895–96 season was the eleventh since the foundation of Southampton St. Mary's F.C. and their second in league football, as members of the Southern League. They finished the league season in third place behind the previous season's champions, Millwall Athletic, and Luton Town. In the FA Cup they reached the first round proper for the second consecutive season, where they were defeated by The Wednesday, of the Football League.

Pre-season
In the spring of 1895, Charles Robson had been appointed secretary to Southampton St Mary's Football Club, then playing in the Southern League. As secretary, he was responsible for signing new players and agreeing player contracts as well as being involved in team selection – the day to day coaching and training of the players was in the hands of the trainer.

One of Robson's first acts as secretary was to accompany Alfred McMinn, one of the club committee, on a trip to the Potteries to recruit players. McMinn was a native of Staffordshire and was "most persuasive on his home turf". On this trip, Robson and McMinn signed six players: Jack Farrell, Samuel Meston and Willie Naughton from Stoke, Watty Keay from Derby County, Joe Turner from Dresden United and Alf Wood from Burslem Port Vale, as well as recruiting Stoke's long-serving trainer, Bill Dawson. The Saints committee were anxious to secure their services and signed then before the Football League season was over. Port Vale and Stoke lodged a complaint with the Football Association about "poaching", and an emergency FA meeting was held at Sheffield, resulting in the Saints being severely censured for negligence. St Mary's were ordered to pay their own costs, plus £4 6s 3d to Stoke and £1 13s to Port Vale. McMinn was suspended for a year and Dawson for a month. Wood's registration with St Mary's was cancelled (shortly afterwards he moved to Stoke).

A proposal was put forward that the name of the club should be amended from Southampton St. Mary's to plain Southampton F.C. – this was rejected on the grounds that the club could no longer be called "The Saints" if the official name was changed. One change that was approved was that the team jerseys should be red and white halves rather than red and white quarters.

League season

The 1895–96 season was the Saints' second in the Southern League, having finished third in the inaugural season. The team started the season badly, losing four of the first five matches, all of which were away from home. The poor start to the season was blamed on the inability of the new players to settle in the area. Eventually, under trainer Dawson's guidance, the team's form improved and there were only two further league defeats; after mid-December, the team suffered only one defeat and kept eight "clean sheets", despite first-choice goalkeeper Tom Cain missing several matches through injury. At the end of the season, they finished third behind Millwall Athletic and Luton Town, with the top three positions identical to the previous year.

Top scorer in the league was Jack Farrell with ten goals from his 17 appearances. The highlight of the league season was the visit of Millwall on 21 March 1896 when a crowd of 8,000 saw the Saints defeat the reigning champions 2–0, with goals from Charles Baker and Joe Turner.

In addition to the Southern League and FA Cup matches, the club played nearly 30 friendly matches, including a 9–0 victory over the Dublin Fusiliers and a 13–0 victory over the City Ramblers, in both of which Jack Farrell scored five goals. There were also victories over Dundee and Tottenham Hotspur.

At the end of the season, the Saints had to vacate the Antelope Ground, which had been sold for re-development, and moved to the County Ground, partly through the connections of the club's president, Robson's former Hampshire strike partner, Dr. H. W. R. Bencraft, who was also Hon. Secretary to the cricket club.

League results

Legend

Top of league table

FA Cup
In the FA Cup, an away victory over local rivals Freemantle in the first qualifying round was followed by comfortable home victories over Marlow (5–0), Reading (3–0) and Uxbridge (3–0). In the First Round proper, the Saints  received a home draw against opposition from the Football League First Division for the second consecutive year, this time against The Wednesday. Saints' trainer, Bill Dawson, spent the week leading up to Wednesday's visit with extra training for the players, taking them through their paces on Shawford Down.

For the match, played at the Antelope Ground on 1 February 1896, the crowd was estimated at 12,000, by far the largest yet recorded for a football match in Southampton. The Saints had to play their third-choice goalkeeper, Walter Cox as Tom Cain was injured, and the Royal Artillery refused to allow on-loan 'keeper "Gunner" Reilly to play. The Saints took an early lead, through Watty Keay, before two goals from Alec Brady gave Wednesday the half-time lead. Wednesday increased their lead shortly after the break, and although Joe Turner got one back, the Saints were unable to score an equalizer. Wednesday ran out 3–2 winners and went on to win the Cup the following April.

Player statistics

Key
 GK — Goalkeeper 
 FB — Full back  
 HB — Half back 
 FW — Forward

Notes
 Sergt. Inglis was loaned to the Saints by the Argyll & Sutherland Highlanders for the final match of the season
 Gunner Phillips was a member of the Royal Artillery team and played the penultimate match of the season on loan to the "Saints"

Transfers

In

Departures

References

Bibliography

External links
Southampton's kit designs
 

Southampton F.C. seasons
Southampton